K101 or K-101 may refer to:

K-101 (Kansas highway), a state highway in Kansas
KIOI, a radio station